William Henry Guttridge (4 March 1931 – 6 April 2013) was an English professional football player and manager.

Career
Guttridge played as a left back for amateur side Metroshaft Works before joining First Division club Wolverhampton Wanderers in 1947.

Nicknamed 'Chopper', mostly played only reserve team games for Wolves, but did make seven first team appearances during his seven-year stay at Molineux, including during their title-winning campaign of 1953–54. His competitive debut came on Christmas Day 1951 in a 3–3 draw at Aston Villa.

Unable to break into Wolves' first team the full-back moved to Midlands neighbours Walsall in November 1954, where he made over 200 appearances - often as captain - during an eight-year spell. A cartilage injury forced his playing retirement in 1962.

After retiring as a player, he worked as a youth coach at Walsall as well as managing Darlaston and Macclesfield Town.

He died on 6 April 2013, at the age of 82, at Walsall Manor Hospital after a long battle with Parkinson's disease.

References

1931 births
2013 deaths
People from Darlaston
English footballers
English football managers
Wolverhampton Wanderers F.C. players
Walsall F.C. players
Stourbridge F.C. players
English Football League players
Macclesfield Town F.C. managers
Association football fullbacks
Neurological disease deaths in England
Deaths from Parkinson's disease
Macclesfield Town F.C. players
Walsall F.C. non-playing staff